Los Leones  is a station of the line 1 of
the Santiago Metro in Chile, and is the northern terminus of the line 6. The station is named for the nearby Los Leones Avenue. Located in the heart of the commercial area of Providencia, some of its entrances are integrated into the retail lower levels of buildings.

A ceramic mosaic by the artist Ramón Vergara Grez was installed in 1993.

The Line 1 station was opened on 22 August 1980 as part of the extension of the line from Salvador to Escuela Militar. It became an interchange station between Line 1 and Line 6 on 2 November 2017 when the inaugural section of Line 6, between Cerrillos and Los Leones, was opened.

It is expected that by 2030 this station will be combined with the future Line 8.

References

Santiago Metro stations
Railway stations opened in 1980
1980 establishments in Chile
Santiago Metro Line 1
Santiago Metro Line 6